Big Bad Voodoo Daddy is a contemporary  swing revival band from Southern California. Their notable singles include "Go Daddy-O", "You & Me & the Bottle Makes 3 Tonight (Baby)", and "Mr. Pinstripe Suit". The band played at the Super Bowl XXXIII halftime show in 1999.

The band was originally formed in Ventura, California, in 1989 by leader Scotty Morris. The band was named Big Bad Voodoo Daddy after Scotty Morris met blues guitar legend Albert Collins at one of the latter's concerts. "He signed my poster 'To Scotty, the big bad voodoo daddy'," Morris explains. "I thought it was the coolest name I ever heard on one of the coolest musical nights I ever had. So when it came time to name this band, I didn't really have a choice. I felt like it was handed down to me."
He and Kurt Sodergren are the two original members, with the rest of the band joining later. The band has concentrated on the swing of the 1940s and 1950s, playing clubs and lounges in their early years.

History

Early career: 1989–1996 
After playing in punk and alternative rock bands during the 1980s, including False Confession, part of the Oxnard, California Nardcore scene, Scotty Morris founded Big Bad Voodoo Daddy with Kurt Sodergren. The band launched two CDs, Big Bad Voodoo Daddy and Watchu' Want for Christmas? under their own label (Big Bad Records) before getting their big break when their songs "You & Me & the Bottle Makes 3 Tonight (Baby)", "I Wan'na Be Like You" and "Go Daddy-O" were featured in the soundtrack of the 1996 comedy-drama Swingers.

The band was also the house band for the television game show Big Deal, a partial remake of Let's Make a Deal.

Commercial success: 1997–2004 
From there, they were signed by Interscope Records. With Interscope, the band released Americana Deluxe, This Beautiful Life, and Save My Soul. The band has continued their tours, performances and album releases. The band appeared at the half-time show of Super Bowl XXXIII (January 31, 1999) and the 2006 Capital One Bowl, and also served as the house band for ESPN's ESPY Awards for a few years. The band created a version of the opening theme for the sitcom 3rd Rock from the Sun, which was used for the 1998-1999 and 1999–2000 seasons.

Live performances and return: 2005–present 
They created a new song for the movie The Wild, and recorded a song for Disney's Phineas and Ferb Christmas Vacation Special.  BBVD also performed on the hit television show Dancing with the Stars, and The Tonight Show with Jay Leno to promote their album How Big Can You Get?: The Music of Cab Calloway, a collection of their renditions of Cab Calloway songs in April 2009. They also have been performing at EPCOT for the annual Food and Wine Festival since 2008. They performed at Kahilu Theatre, Waimea Hawaii and while Kurt  was there he spoke of going to Scott's house in Ventura  and working on a new album beginning February 2019.

Band members 
Current members
 Scotty Morris (lead vocals and guitar)
 Kurt Sodergren (drums and percussion)
 Dirk Shumaker (double bass and vocals)
 Andy Rowley (baritone saxophone and vocals)
 Glen "The Kid" Marhevka (trumpet)
 Karl Hunter (saxophones and clarinet)
 Joshua Levy (piano, arranger)

Touring members

 Alex "Crazy Legs" Henderson (trombone)
 Mitchell Cooper (Lead Trumpet)
 Matthew Mill (Lead Trumpet)

Former members

 Jeff Harris (Trombone) (Americana Deluxe) 
 Ralph Votrian (Trumpet) (Big Bad Voodoo Daddy)

Discography

Albums

Studio albums

Live albums

Compilation albums

Extended plays

Singles

Filmography
 Big Bad Voodoo Daddy appeared as themselves in Night of the Living Doo, a special farcical episode of Scooby-Doo.
 Big Bad Voodoo Daddy appeared as themselves in the 1996 film Swingers, in which they played a set (including "You & Me & the Bottle Makes 3 Tonight (Baby)") at a club that the characters visit.
 An uncredited appearance as the band at Salinger's Restaurant in the Party of Five season 2 episode "Change Partners... And Dance".
 The band appeared on an episode of Hell's Kitchen when they attended dinner service in the twelfth episode of Season 13.
 In 1999, the band appeared in season 2 episode 19 of Ally McBeal, "Let's Dance", during a swing dance competition.

References

External links 
 
 Listen to Big Bad Voodoo Daddy: Live In Los Angeles at Walt Disney Concert Hall 1-1-2010 npr.org Retrieved 15 March 2011, 96 minutes.

American swing musical groups
Swing revival ensembles
Musical groups established in 1989
Musical groups from Ventura County, California